Jang Dong-min (born July 20, 1979), is a South Korean comedian. He is known as ‘comedian who curses a lot’, (his comedy style is mainly on yelling and cursing). He is part of Gag Concert's 19th class (class of 2004), together with Yoo Se-yoon and Yoo Sang-moo. He is part of 옹달샘 (Ongdalsaem) a trio with them. He was the winner of the 3rd and 4th seasons of The Genius. He is especially noted in the industry for his witty, though often critical and condescending gags. It was often reported that he was under controversy for such related incidents.

Education
Jang graduated from Sorabol High School in 1998, and went to pursue tertiary education at Dong-ah Institute of Media and Arts.

Personal life
On December 6, 2021, it was announced that Jang is getting married to a non-celebrity, they are planning to hold a wedding ceremony in Jeju Island on December 19, 2021. On January 17, 2022, it was confirmed that Jang's wife is pregnant. On June 17, 2022, his wife gave birth to their first child, a daughter.

Filmography

Film

Television series

Variety shows

Radio programs

Music videos

Ambassadorship 
 Public Relations Ambassador of Wonju, Gangwon Province (2023)

References

See also

1979 births
Living people
South Korean male comedians
South Korean male television actors
Dong-ah Institute of Media and Arts alumni